The Black Death is a Gothic novel by English writer Basil Copper. It was originally announced for publication by Arkham House but was ultimately published by Fedogan & Bremer in 1992 in an edition of 1,000 copies of which 100 were numbered and signed by the author and illustrator.

Plot introduction
The novel is set in Victorian England and concerns John Carter, an architect who leaves London to become a junior partner in a prosperous building firm in Thornton Bassett, a village in Dartmoor. His hopes for a new life fade as he discovers a sinister mystery.

Sources

1992 American novels
American gothic novels
American mystery novels
Novels set in Devon
Novels set in London
Fedogan & Bremer books